Sanidastra is a genus of sponges belonging to the family Spongillidae.

Species:

Sanidastra yokotonensis

References

Spongillidae
Sponge genera